Tears in Heaven (In Chinese:海上繁花; Hai Shang Bang Hua, also known as "Variety Flowers At Seaside") in Spain, Tears in Heaven, in Mexico, Tears in Paradise is a Chinese television drama series based on the novel written by Fei Wo Si Cun and directed by Hua Qing. It stars Shawn Dou , Li Qin, Leon Zhang, Ai Ru, Sheng Ziming, Wang Rui Zi, Li Ting Zhe, the drama was filmed in Shanghai and Pingtan Island to be broadcast on various channels from June 23, 2021, to July 24, 2021.

Synopsis
Du Xiaosu is an entertainment reporter looking for the scoop looking to interview actress Yan Jingjing upon her arrival at the airport, while seeing businessman Lei Yuzheng who was about to leave on a business trip. Accidentally Du Xiaosu and Lei Yuzheng meet. They meet again since they met in the past, they collide on the road, she is horrified and apologizes, while Lei Yuzheng watching her and recognizes her and remembers that night when he was driving and saw Du Xiaosu on the road walking, passing out in the rain while he saves and takes her away, since that night left a mark on his memory and he has not forgotten her. Later, Du Xiaosu, losing the interview, looking for a way, posing as a nurse and sneaking into a hospital room to take a picture of the rising star patient after the car accident, she meets Shao Zhenrong, a kind and handsome doctor on duty, who begins to feel attracted, they both meet and begin their relationship, eventually they were going to get married and have a home.

She has an appointment with Shao Zhenrong on her birthday, when leaving the restaurant she sees Lei Yuzheng with the new actress Xu You, Du Xiaosu met her through social networks and interviews seemed unfair and decides to talk to actress Yan Jingjing who was fired Du Xiaosu decides to do her justice, looking to interview him and claim him, he stops on the road while Lei Yuzheng sees her from inside the vehicle and remembering her, so they communicate in person for the first time but both begin to have prejudices. Later, when Shao Zhenrong invite hers to meet all his family, Du Xiaosu meets them and discovers to her horror that the brother is none other than Lei Yuzheng. A few days later Shao Zhenrong's mother reveals that she had an affair with Du Xiaosu's father who had abandoned her breaking her heart an she forbids her relationship with Shao Zhenrong because she would not be able to welcome her into the family as it would be a constant reminder of her pain. Due to the situation Du Xiaosu breaks up with Shao Zhenrong. He without knowing the reason, heartbroken and decides to go to Yunnan. 

Shao Zhenrong on his way to Yunnan faces a landslide on the highway, resulting in serious injuries. Du Xiaosu travels to Yunnan to recover Shao Zherong but finds out that he had an accident, and, horrified  goes looking for him. While in the hospital, she finds Shao Zhenrong fighting for his life while she sees him for the last time saying goodbye and dies in front of her leaving her in pain, and after fainting she sees Shao Zhenrong crying while Lei Yuzheng full of anger and pain separates Du Xiaosu from Shao Zhenrong judging her cruelly and coldly asks her to go away and walk away as she is not worthy of him.

With everyone in the cemetery, at the end Du Xiaosu decides to go, but on the way she meets Lei Yuzheng, preventing her from approaching, both of them start to argue in pain and he begins to speak ill of her, having prejudices, Du Xiaosu not knowing why he treats her so badly, Lei Yuzheng confesses to her the rainy night how they met, making her remember, a year ago he saw her unconscious on the road while driving, he got out of the car to help her and took her to his apartment, while Lei Yuzheng was there, he took off her wet clothes and takes Du Xiaosu in his arms in the bedroom laying her down, hence Du Xiaosu woke up drunk and saw him and begins to seduce him by giving him her love and captivation, at that moment Lei Yuzheng felt attracted and wanted by her, both were together that night, but she faints and since then she does not remember. When Du Xiaosu finds out, she is surprised what happened, what she remembers is that she went to the restaurant and they told her that a man sent her the wrong way. The previous night back, she inadvertently went to Lei Yuzheng's apartment and paid for the alcohol consumption, informing the waiter, to which Lei Yuzheng asks her to leave and not bother Shao Zhenrong.

Du Xiaosu, in pain and feeling guilty, wants to fulfill Shao Zhenrong's dream and get the house that he gave her, but she finds out that it is for sale by Lei Yuzheng, so she is going to claim it by confronting and fighting for it, Lei Yuzheng fires her from the house and from the company. Du Xiaosu without giving up begins to look for work as a waitress in a bar, fighting for her designs, working in the construction site risking her life without stopping until one day she visits the grave of Shao Zhenrong confessing that her effort is in vain that she can no longer go on, Lei Yuzheng, seeing Du Xiaosu's suffering and in pain, he is moved and decides to help her without letting her know why he decides to return her the house, Du Xiaosu, upon finding out, thanks him, taking him to the restaurant where Shao Zhenrong used to eat after leaving from the hospital, surprised Lei Yuzheng sees Du Xiaosu crying, showing her tenderness and sweetness before him, feeling anguished at seeing her suffer and affected by being treated so badly without knowing her, then Du Xiaosu shares a boat ticket asking him for a favor to go visit the children in Pingtan Island in company, Lei Yuzheng is excited and both travel together get to know the children and the sun teacher who brings them joy, love and happiness, Du Xiaosu and Lei Yuzheng begin to get along, understand each other by starting their friendship as friends, Lei Yuzheng trusts her for the first time, tells her about his past to which Du Xiaosu encourages and supports him.

After the trip, being in Shanghai, his school takes him to a secret place where he tells her about his childhood with Shao Zherong, letting his memories affect Du Xiaosu, to which Lei Yuzheng gives him encouragement. As the months go by, they both spend pleasant moments together in the annual yutian festival, the engagement of Lin Xiangyuan and Jiang Fanlu, in business matters, visiting the island to see the children, leaving behind the prejudices and misunderstandings they had, Lei Yuzheng sees in her a wonderful woman and special so she can't resist secretly helping her, who she believes is a pervert who only wants to harass him, on several occasions Du Xiaosu gets nervous and blushes when Lei Yuzheng approaches her or when they are alone, they both fall in love hiding his feelings. On the other hand, Lin Xiangyuan ruins Lei Yuzheng by taking him to prison, from there he changed his attitude, becoming cruel. Upon learning what happened, Du Xiaosu is affected and sad so she decides to help him, she takes care of his father, Mr. Lei Ting, making sacrifices for Lei Yuzheng, while he spends eight months in prison. After he is released from prison, he learns the truth about his mother and loses his father, leaving him deeply hurt, he enters a depressive trauma, compulsively begins to treat everyone badly, including Du Xiaosu, for which he feels guilty, being affected and hurting himself, seeing that Du Xiaosu is by his side without giving up helping him Lei Yuzheng is shocked, regretful, depressed, he values ​​it very much and clung to her, thanks to Du Xiaosu Lei Yuzheng returns to the company so he makes up for lost time, both being in love they begin to be together supporting each other, but Du Xiaosu upon meeting his rich friends feels that she will not fit in, she will not be able to be like them for what she walks away being indifferent to Lei Yuzheng, leaving him devastated. As a result of the circumstances, some men chase him, so he distances himself to protect her, but she believes and feels that she is being betrayed, so she begins to doubt her feelings towards Lei Yuzheng, causing great pain. and affecting her health, Lei Yuzheng, seeing her in poor condition, cannot resist being separated from Du Xiaosu for even a moment, so he wants to conquer her and recover her.

On the other hand, Zou Siqi and He Qunfei, Jiang Fanlu and Lin Xiangyuan get married, they invite both to the wedding as witnesses, the couples are already married, He Siqi and Lin Fanlu, the brides throw the bouquets, choosing Du Xiaosu and Lei Yuzheng, being the following boyfriends to get married so Du Xiaosu is amazed, shakes hands while Lei Yuzheng feels lucky and excited, both accept with great happiness to which Lei Yuzheng finds it difficult to resist his love for Du Xiaosu decides to get closer and pursue her by becoming her assistant, while Du Xiaosu continues with his design work, he asks her to help her, so she agrees, spending a week Lei Yuzheng wants to have a serious love relationship with Du Xiaosu but she rejects him, which makes her sad, Du Xiaosu does not know if her destiny is to be together with him, she is afraid of being harmed, but deep down she loves him. Then the director Liu breaks the news to Du Xiaosu about being chosen as the designer contestant in Paris so she has to go to the extra njero putting him in a difficult decision, Lei Yuzheng upon finding out goes to look for her, asking her not to leave and wants to help her but Du Xiaosu decided to go to fulfill her dream so she rejects him and lets him go, Lei Yuzheng with a wounded and devastated heart feels that Du Xiaosu loses her, he is hurt by her decision and sees her leave his side, but Lei Yuzheng does not give up, he feels that he cannot live without her, he realizes that his love and happiness that he longed for and hoped was Du Xiaosu he had fallen in love with her from the beginning, he loves her deeply, secretly Lei Yuzheng has an engagement ring to give her, being willing to fight for the love of his life.

Du Xiaosu prepares her luggage to go to Paris to compete suddenly the teacher sun calls to tell her to visit her without realizing that Lei Yuzheng following her, having prepared a gift especially for her, Du Xiaosu travels to the island to visit the children being there, she sees the sun teacher telling her that the foundation is in her name founded by Lei Yuzheng, to which she is surprised, later Du Xiaosu walking towards the seashore feels great sadness and loneliness in her heart that misses and at the same time remembers the good times she spent together with Lei Yuzheng, to her surprise fate brought them together again they both meet again together on the island Lei Yuzheng confesses his love to Du Xiaosu asking her to be by his side and be part of it for the rest of his life, she crying sadly for going abroad and not wanting to leave him realizes her sacrifice that she cannot live without him, they are destined to be together being his true love Du Xiaosu accepts him to what Lei Yuzheng with full of happiness fulfills his dream of having a happy and loving family, being both happy they give themselves showing their love giving each other a passionate kiss and a big warm hug under the sunset fulfilling their dreams being the lucky lovers in love they marry what were their ways neutralized, Du Xiaosu and Lei Yuzheng are a single united parallel.

Cast

Main

Supporting

Recurring Characters

The Du Family

The Lei Family

The Shao Family

The Jiang Family

The He Family

The Lin Family

Other characters 
Zhang Xiao Gui as Lei Yuzheng's friend.
Zhang Hao Cheng as Liu Siyang.
Zhao Yue Cheng as Xie Li.
Wei Guan Nan as Shangguan Bo Yao.
Gao Shu Yao as Yan Jingjing the first actress.
Yi Shan as Xu You the second actress.
Dong Zi Liang like master Xiao Sun, takes care of children.
Karl Robert Eislen as Professor Ohm, idol of Du Xiaosu.
Ma Xiao Kai as Ye Shenkuan.
Liu Bo Xi as Li Mengnan.
Hu Jia Hua as Lin Dun.
Wei Jun as Wang Guixiang.
Li Dong as Lao Mo.
Yuan Fan as a reporter.
Yan Yi Min as Ceo Liu.
Zhu Xiao Gang as Yan Jingjing's assistant.

Episode 
Tears in Heaven series was confirmed for 41 episodes (Direct Uncut Version) in China from 2021.

It is said that the drama is not over yet, there will be a Tears in Heaven Season 2.

According to the original book, the novel has more chapters, so it is less in the series.

Soundtrack
The Tears in Heaven OST soundtrack of the series is confirmed by seven songs:

Production 
The series is based on the novel " Variety Flowers At Seaside" (Chinese:佳期如梦之海上繁花) by Fei Wo Si Cun.

The series was also known as "Tears in Heaven" (Chinese:海上繁花).

It was directed by director Hua Qing and Shen Yi.

In the production, he had Zhang Sheng Yan and Jiang Xiao Ping along with the support of executive producer Yang Yu and Bu Yu.

The protagonists who play their characters were called similar to their names but interspersed.

The soundtrack are by various artists and the melody is by the director.

It featured production companies Shuimu Qingyuan Entertainment, Dream Sky Films, Impact Media, Omnijoi, and was distributed by Jiangsu TV.

Filming started on November 18, 2016 in Shanghai and on Pingtan Island until March 9, 2017.

Popularity 
The drama has been surprised by fans of the author, who is known for her melodramas and uncontrollable tears that took four years to show.

International Transmission 
The series was broadcast internationally through YouTube, the recount of episodes for international broadcast was 41.

References

External links 
https://www.betaseries.com/es/show/tears-in-heaven-2021
https://www.cdramalove.com/tears-in-heaven-chinese-drama/
https://latestnews.fresherslive.com/articles/tears-in-heaven-chinese-drama-cast-who-are-the-cast-in-tears-in-heaven-453637

Chinese romance television series
2021 Chinese television series debuts
Television shows based on works by Fei Wo Si Cun